1979 JSL Cup Final was the fourth final of the JSL Cup competition. The final was played at Osaka Nagai Stadium in Osaka on July 29, 1979. Yomiuri won the championship.

Overview
Yomiuri won their 1st title, by defeating Furukawa Electric 3–2.

Match details

See also
1979 JSL Cup

References

JSL Cup
1979 in Japanese football
Tokyo Verdy matches
JEF United Chiba matches